Vettambadi is an Indian village situated east of Namakkal and west of  Sendamangalam.

Vettambadi is located on the Namakkal-Sendamangalam Highway, 5 km from Namakkal. The people in the village are mostly involved in agriculture and in the lorry (truck) business. There is a Mariyamman temple located in the Village. The festival is celebrated once in a year.it was celebrated for one week. Mathuraveeran veeran temple is located in vettambadi.

Villages in Namakkal district